Belém is a municipality in Paraíba state in the Northeast Region of Brazil.

References

Municipalities in Paraíba